Fukaura (written: 深浦) is a Japanese surname. Notable people with the surname include:

, Japanese actress
, Japanese shogi player

Japanese-language surnames